Himmelsrichtungen (Cardinal Points) is the eighth studio album by pianist/composer Juan María Solare, released on 20 March 2016 in the label Janus Music & Sound (based in Germany). The album is a digital only release.

Recorded at the Theatersaal of the university of Bremen (Germany) on 30 September 2014. Grand piano Bösendorfer.
Cover image by the British artist Alban Low. UPC: 5054227090752

Reception 

During the first month after release, the first track (Siesta Norteña) was included in Spotify's official playlist "Fresh Finds - Cyclone". As for 31 August 2016, two of the six tracks are among Solare's top five listened tracks on Spotify.

The composition itself 

Himmelsrichtungen is a piano cycle in which to the usual four cardinal points two were added (zenith and nadir), to achieve a three-dimensional room. The piano cycle has been composed in September–October 2004. The whole cycle (20 minutes long) is dedicated to different members of the Dehning family.
ISWC (International Standard Musical Work Code): T-802.175.109-8

Track listing

References

External links
Allmusic entry
Spotify streaming
official release information
Album review by GotMeghan
short review in the blog j-musind (in Spanish)

2016 albums
Concept albums
Juan María Solare albums
Albums produced by Juan María Solare
Classical albums by Argentine artists